Chelow kabab is an Iranian dish consisting of steamed rice and one of the many varieties of Iranian kebab. It is considered the national dish of Iran, and was probably created by the time of the Qajar dynasty.

Chelow kebab is served with accompaniments such as butter, sumac powder, basil, onions, and grilled tomatoes. The traditional beverage accompanied with chelow kebab is doogh, an Iranian yogurt-based drink, sometimes made of carbonated water. 

In the old bazaar tradition, the rice and accompaniments are served first, immediately followed by the kababs, which are threaded on skewers, as well as a piece of flat bread (typically lavash). A skewer is placed directly on the rice and while holding the kabab down on the rice with the bread, the skewer is quickly pulled out.

Varieties 
 Barg - barbecued and marinated lamb, chicken or beef kabab dish. The most popular form is filet mignon beef.
 Koobideh - is an Iranian minced meat kabab which is made from ground lamb, beef, or chicken, often mixed with parsley and chopped onions.
 Jujeh - grilled chunks of chicken, sometimes with bone, sometimes boneless.
 Soltani - soltānī, meaning "(a meal) in the style of a sultan." Typically it is combo plate of barg and koobideh plus rice.
 Sah abbasi - şāh äbbāsī, meaning "(a meal) in the style of a shah." Typically it is combo plate of barg, koobideh and jujeh plus rice.

See also
Nan-e-kabab
Pilaf
Iranian cuisine

References
 

Iranian cuisine
National dishes